GYRO is a computational plasma physics code developed and maintained at General Atomics.  It solves the 5-D coupled gyrokinetic-Maxwell equations using a combination of finite difference, finite element and spectral methods.  Given plasma equilibrium data, GYRO can determine the rate of turbulent transport of particles, momentum and energy.

See also
List of plasma (physics) articles

External links
 GYRO Homepage at General Atomics 

Computational physics
Physics software
Plasma physics
Tokamaks